, was a video game production company, established in February 1978 and headquartered in Meguro, Tokyo, Japan. The company suspended business in October 5, 1999. In February 2023, Japanese video game publisher Hamster Corporation acquired the rights to Allumer's catalog of titles. After the acqusition, titles from the company began to appear on their Arcade Archives series of re-releases, beginning with Magical Speed.

Notable works

Arcade
 Blandia (licensed by Taito)
 Great Swordsman (published by Taito)
 Joshi Volleyball (published by Taito)
 Mad Shark/Saikyōsame (clone of Raiden)
 Magical Speed (published by Namco)
 Mahjong Yonshimai Wakakusa Monogatari (hardware design) (published by Maboroshi Ware)
 Masked Riders Club Battle Race (published by Banpresto)
 Godzilla (published by Banpresto)
 Mobile Suit Gundam (published by Banpresto)
 Mobile Suit Gundam: EX Revue (published by Banpresto) (CG Production: Studio Dews) 
 Gladiator (published by Taito)
 Rezon
 US Classic (published by Seta)
 Zing Zing Zip (published by Tecmo)
 War of Aero- Project MEIOU (published by Yang Cheng Electronic Co. Ltd.)
 SD Gundam Neo Battling (published by Banpresto)
 Ultraman Club: Tatakae! Ultraman Kyoudai!! (published by Banpresto)
 Tokusyu Butai UAG / Thundercade / Twin Formation (published by Taito)

PC
 Fortune Quest (unreleased)

PlayStation
 Gokuu Densetsu: Magic Beast Warriors
 Idol Promotion: Yumie Suzuki

See also
 SETA Corporation
 Visco Corporation

References

Hamster Corporation
Video game companies established in 1978
Video game companies disestablished in 1999
Companies that have filed for bankruptcy in Japan
Defunct video game companies of Japan
Video game development companies
Japanese companies established in 1978
Japanese companies disestablished in 1999